"Planet X" is a 2004 storyline published by Marvel Comics that ran from New X-Men #146–150. The story is the penultimate arc of Grant Morrison's run as writer on the X-Men, and features the return of Magneto and the death of Jean Grey again.

Plot 
Coming off the heels of the "Assault on Weapon Plus" storyline, Jean Grey, Beast, and Emma Frost leave the X-Mansion while Xorn forces the newest member of the "Special Class", Dust, to attack Professor X and destroy Cerebra. Confronting Xavier, Xorn imprisons Dust in a jar to keep her from helping the professor, and then removes his mask, to reveal that he is Magneto in disguise.

Magneto, enjoying the lack of progress Xavier has made in improving mutantkind's lot since his "death" (partly due to his manipulations), has begun to teach his militant anti-human philosophy to the Special Class while indulging in the mutant-power enhancing drug Kick, supplied to him by his helper, Esme of the Stepford Cuckoos. He also reveals that he (Magneto) has been responsible for restoring Xavier's mobility via reprogramming the nanite Sentinels inserted into Xavier's body by Cassandra Nova and shuts them down and places the once more crippled Xavier in a glass tank, in a state of suspended animation. Magneto, surrounded by his followers and original Brotherhood member Toad, takes over New York City. Magneto lays waste to the city and engages in multiple acts of mass murder, killing thousands of humans trapped in the city. Magneto also reveals his grand scheme: reversing Earth's magnetic field and remake the planet as "Planet X" in which mutants, the possessors of the "X-gene", ruled over ordinary humans.

Meanwhile, in space, Jean Grey and Wolverine are stranded on Asteroid M as Magneto has sent it hurling into the sun just as the two recognize the base. Wanting to end her suffering, Wolverine stabs Jean. Her seeming death allows her to be connect with the Phoenix Force, though in full control over her powers this time, and escape with Logan back to Earth. They rescue Beast and Emma Frost, whose jetcraft was destroyed by Magneto, stranding the two at sea on the wreckage of the ship. Meanwhile, Cyclops and Fantomex organize a resistance group with help from the remaining Stepford Cuckoos, and are joined by Beak, who rejects Magneto when the latter, in part due to his drug addiction and loss of sanity, starts killing humans by the hundreds.

In the final showdown, Xavier is freed and the New X-Men unite to fight Magneto. As Magneto murders Esme, Cyclops tells the grieving Emma that he's decided upon which woman (Jean or Emma) he loves but is interrupted by Magneto's attack and responds in kind, destroying his helmet as Fantomex frees Xavier. Desperate for protection against Xavier's telepathy, Magneto grabs his "Xorn" mask and puts it on. Having realized that Xorn is Magneto or at least believes himself to be Magneto, the X-Men attempt to unbalance him by calling him Xorn as they attack, complete with them begging "Xorn" to tell them why "he" betrayed the X-Men.

Magneto, whose sanity is slipping due to excessive "Kick" usage, begins to rant furiously that he is not Xorn, but Magneto as a crowd of Magneto's supporters gather alongside Xavier and Jean Grey. Jean orders Magneto to address his angry army, who are furious at Magneto for the way that he has failed to address the lack of food and water for his makeshift army of Manhattan mutants since taking over the island. Magneto (who removes the "Xorn" mask) tries to calm them down, but the crowd doesn't recognize him due to his optic-blast-damaged face. At that point Xavier explains that Magneto, with his murderous rampage, has lost all credibility with the masses. Xavier admits that in death, Magneto had finally gained legitimacy amongst humans and mutants alike as a true figure for change in society but that his return and the mass murders he committed had caused the world to label Magneto as a fraud. Xavier opines that the days of him and Magneto as the sole ideologies of mutantkind was over and that it was time for mutantkind to come up with their own opinions and theories of their place in the world.

Magneto falls over and Jean Grey approaches him, only to be hit by a lethal electro-magnetic pulse. As Jean falls to the ground dying, Magneto (putting the Xorn helmet back on) defiantly cries out for someone to kill him; Magneto would rather be dead than judged by the mutant masses as a fraud. Wolverine, now berserk at the sight of Jean dying, uses his claws to decapitate Magneto.

Dying, Jean is held tightly by Cyclops as the two reconcile. With her dying breath, Jean begs Cyclops to move on with his life and not waste his remaining days mourning her, as she tells Scott, "All I ever do is die on you..."

The final pages of the issue cut to 150 years into the future, where a "Phoenix Egg" is found on the moon by an astronaut, offering a segue into the final arc of Morrison's X-Men run, the future based "Here Comes Tomorrow".

Behind the scenes 

Grant Morrison had intended Xorn to be the real Magneto. However, Marvel reversed several of Morrison's decisions after the "Planet X" arc, and reintroduced Magneto (in Chris Claremont's new Excalibur book), establishing that Magneto had survived the destruction of Genosha, and had remained there since. Marvel also introduced a new Xorn (in Chuck Austen's X-Men), establishing that the new Xorn was the brother of the original and that the original had been possessed by some (unknown) force, widely believed to be Sublime, a conscious, highly evolved and intelligent bacteria colony. Austen explained Marvel's reasoning for the retconning, stating that "Marvel saw value in Magneto not being a mass-murderer of New Yorkers."

Morrison has expressed surprise at the various retcons and explanations for the events of the story that emerged after his departure from Marvel. During an interview, Morrison said "Here's how to explain what happened – XORN was NEVER REAL, he was a DISGUISE for MAGNETO who went MAD ON DRUGS and DIED...but we know he always COMES BACK, somehow, so expect a dramatic return sooner or later, True Believers!"

When asked to comment on their characterization of Magneto, Grant Morrison responded: "What people often forget, of course, is that Magneto, unlike the lovely Sir Ian McKellen, is a mad old terrorist twat. No matter how he justifies his stupid, brutal behaviour, or how anyone else tries to justify it, in the end he's just an old bastard with daft, old ideas based on violence and coercion. I really wanted to make that clear at this time." Morrison also stated that the arc was intended as a statement on the rigidly elastic nature of the status quo in franchise comics, and that the arc had taken such dark leanings because "my loved ones were dying all around me" at the time of writing.

Collected editions 
The series has been collected into a trade paperback:

Planet X (collects New X-Men #146–150)

As well as:

New X-Men Omnibus (collects New X-Men #114–154 and Annual 2001, 992 pages, December 2006 )
 New X-Men by Grant Morrison Ultimate Collection: Volume 3 (collects New X-Men #142–154, 336 pages, December 2008)

References

External links 
 

New X-Men story arcs